Ross and Macdonald was one of Canada's most notable architecture firms in the early 20th century.  Based in Montreal, Quebec, the firm originally operated as a partnership between George Allen Ross and David MacFarlane (known as Ross and MacFarlane) from 1907 to 1912.  MacFarlane withdrew from the firm in 1912, and Robert Henry Macdonald became a partner.

The Ross and Macdonald name was used until 1944, after which it became Ross & Ross, Architects, when John Kenneth Ross joined his father as partner. Following George Allen Ross's death in 1946, the firm continued as Ross, Patterson, Townsend & Heughan. By 1970, the firm was known as Ross, Fish, Duschenes & Barrett. Since 2006, it has operated as DFS Inc. Architecture & Design.

George Allen Ross 

Ross (1879–1946) was born in Montreal, and later studied at the High School of Montreal, the Massachusetts Institute of Technology in Cambridge, Massachusetts, and the École des Beaux-Arts in Paris.

Ross was apprenticed to Brown, MacVicar & Heriot in Montreal, and later become a draftsman for the Grand Trunk Railway. He also did work with Parker & Thomas in Boston and Carrere & Hastings in New York before partnering with MacFarlane in Montreal.

He was a Fellow of the Royal Architectural Institute of Canada. He was also a member of the Royal Institute of British Architects, becoming an Associate in 1904 and a Fellow in 1913.

Robert Henry Macdonald 
Macdonald (1875–1942) was born in Melbourne, Australia.  He articled to Richard B. Whitaker, M.S.A. of Melbourne, and became a junior draftsman to Robert Findlay in Montreal in 1895.  After positions as a draftsman for George B. Post starting in 1903, a senior draftsman with Crighton & McKay in Wellington, New Zealand in 1905, and head draftsman with W.W. Bosworth in New York in 1906, Macdonald joined Ross and MacFarlane in Montreal as a junior partner and draftsman in 1907.  He ultimately became a partner of the firm in 1912.

He was a Fellow of the Royal Architectural Institute of Canada and of the Royal Institute of British Architects.  He served as president of the Quebec Association of Architects in 1939, and was a recipient of the association's Award of Merit.

Important works 

Commercial Buildings:
 Bank of Toronto branch (Guy St. and St. Catherine St. W.), Montreal, 1908
 Complexe Les Ailes, Montreal, 1925-27  (Former Eaton's department store)
 Saskatoon Board of Education offices, Saskatoon, 1928-29 (Former Eaton's department store)
 Former Eaton's Store, Calgary, 1928-29 (demolished 1988, façade incorporated into Calgary Eaton Centre)
 Dominion Square Building, Montreal, 1928–1930
 College Park, Toronto, 1928-30 (Former Eaton's department store)(with Sproatt and Rolph)
 Holt Renfrew Montreal at 1300 Sherbrooke Street West, Montreal, 1937 (building closed in 2020, moved with nearby Ogilvy's store on St.Catherine St.)

Hotels:
 Château Laurier Hotel, Ottawa, 1909-12 (with Bradford Lee Gilbert)
 (History of the Fairmont Château Laurier)
 Lord Elgin Hotel, Ottawa, 1940–41
 Royal York Hotel, Toronto, 1927-29 (with Sproatt and Rolph)
 (Royal York Hotel)
 Fort Garry Hotel, Winnipeg, 1910–14
 Hotel Saskatchewan, Regina, 1926–27
 Hotel Macdonald, Edmonton, 1912–14
 Les Cours Mont-Royal, Montreal, 1920-24 (Former Sheraton Mount Royal Hotel, now a shopping mall, condo and office complex)

Public Buildings:
 Government Conference Centre, Ottawa, (Former Ottawa Union Station), 1911-1912
 (The Architecture of Ottawa's Union Station)
 Union Station, Toronto (with Hugh G. Jones, John Lyle) 1914-1920
 (Toronto Union Station - Heritage Character Analysis)

Office Buildings:
 Architects' Building, Montreal, 1929-34 (demolished)
 Confederation Building (McGill College Ave. and St. Catherine St. W.), Montreal, 1927–28
 Castle Building (Stanley Street and St. Catherine St. W.), Montreal, 1924–27
 Dominion Square Building (Peel Street and St. Catherine St. W.), Montreal, 1928–40
 Montreal Star Building (St. Jacques St.), Montreal, 1926–31
 Royal Bank Building (Yonge Street and King Street East), Toronto, 1913–15
 Édifice Price (Sainte-Anne street), Quebec City, 1929–1930.
 Medical Arts Building, Montreal, 1922

Residential:
Le Chateau Apartments, (Sherbrooke and De La Montagne) Montreal, 1926
The Gleneagles, (Cote des Neiges Road) Montreal, 1929

Other:
 Central Technical School, Toronto, 1915
 The Hydrostone, Halifax, 1918
 Maple Leaf Gardens, Toronto, 1931–32

References

Further reading 
 Jacques Lachapelle, Le fantasme métropolitain : l'architecture de Ross et Macdonald : bureaux, magasins et hôtels 1905‑1942 (in French)
 Ross career summary
 Ross bio, McGill University
 Macdonald career summary
 Macdonald bio, McGill University

External links 
 DFS Inc. Architecture & Design (current website of the successor firm)
 Photos of Ross and MacDonald buildings in Montreal
 Finding aid for the Ross & Macdonald fonds , Canadian Centre for Architecture (digitized items)

Architecture firms of Canada
Companies based in Montreal